Peter Robinson (17 March 1950 – 4 October 2022) was a British-born Canadian crime writer who was best known for his crime novels set in Yorkshire featuring Inspector Alan Banks. He also published a number of other novels and short stories, as well as some poems and two articles on writing.

Early life
Robinson was born in Armley, Leeds, on 17 March 1950. His father, Clifford, worked as a photographer; his mother, Miriam (Jarvis), was a homemaker. Robinson studied English literature at the University of Leeds, graduating with a Bachelor of Arts with honours. He then emigrated to Canada in 1974 to continue his studies, obtaining a Master of Arts in English and Creative Writing from the University of Windsor, with Joyce Carol Oates as his tutor. He was later awarded a Doctor of Philosophy in English at York University in 1983.

Career
Robinson taught at several college and universities in Toronto, including the University of Windsor (his alma mater) as writer-in-residence from 1992 to 1993. He was best known for the Inspector Banks series of novels set in the fictional Yorkshire town of Eastvale. His first novel, Gallows View, was published in 1987. It garnered him the Crime Writers of Canada Arthur Ellis Award, which he went on to win six more times during his career. The series was eventually translated into twenty languages at the time of his death. He also wrote two collections of short stories – Not Safe After Dark (1998) and The Price of Love (2009) – as well as another novel, Caedmon's Song, released in 1990.

Personal life
Robinson resided in the Beaches area of Toronto with his wife, Sheila Halladay, and he occasionally taught crime writing at the University of Toronto's School of Continuing Studies. He also taught at a number of Toronto colleges and served as Writer-in-Residence at the University of Windsor, 1992–1993. Robinson and his wife had a holiday cottage in Richmond, North Yorkshire. He died on 4 October 2022, at the age of 72.

Awards and honours 
In 2020, Robinson received the Grand Master Award from Crime Writers of Canada, and in 2010, he received their Derrick Murdoch Award. Two years prior, he had been honoured with the Toronto Public Library Celebrates Reading Award.

Publications

Inspector Banks series
Set in the fictional English town of Eastvale in the Yorkshire Dales. Robinson has stated that Eastvale is modelled on Ripon and Richmond and is somewhere north of Ripon, close to the A1 road. A former member of the London Metropolitan Police, Inspector Alan Banks leaves the capital for a quieter life in the Dales. Since 2010 several of the novels have been adapted for television under the series title DCI Banks with Stephen Tompkinson in the title role.

 Gallows View (1987), 
 A Dedicated Man (1988), 
 A Necessary End (1989), 
 The Hanging Valley (1989), 
 Past Reason Hated (1991), 
 Wednesday's Child (1992), 
 Dry Bones That Dream (1994),  (published in the United States as Final Account)
 Innocent Graves (1996), 
 Dead Right (1997),  (published in the United States as Blood at the Root)
 In a Dry Season (1999), 
 Cold Is the Grave (2000), 
 Aftermath (2001), 
 The Summer that Never Was (2003),  (published in the United States as Close to Home)
 Playing with Fire (2004), 
 Strange Affair (2005), 
 Piece of My Heart (2006), 
 Friend of the Devil (2007), 
 All the Colours of Darkness (2008), 
 Bad Boy (2010), 
 Watching the Dark (2012), 
 Children of the Revolution (2013), 
 Abattoir Blues (2014),  (published in the United States as In the Dark Places)
 When the Music's Over (2016), 
 Sleeping in the Ground (2017), 
 Careless Love (2018), 
 Many Rivers to Cross (2019), 
 Not Dark Yet (2021), 
 Standing in the Shadows (2023),

Other works
Although Caedmon's Song is a standalone novella, it is related to Friend of the Devil, which is also related to Aftermath.

 Caedmon's Song (1990), 
 The First Cut – American edition of Caedmon's Song (1993), 
 No Cure for Love (1995), 
 Not Safe After Dark (Crippen & Landru, 1998 & Macmillan Publishers, 2004),  (Short stories; includes three Inspector Banks stories)
 The Price of Love (2009),  (Short stories; includes an Inspector Banks novella and three Banks stories)
 Before The Poison (2011),

References

External links
 Peter Robinson's official website
 Interview with Peter Robinson at www.TheCrimeHouse.com 2009

 
1950 births
2022 deaths
20th-century Canadian novelists
20th-century Canadian short story writers
21st-century Canadian novelists
21st-century Canadian short story writers
Alumni of the University of Leeds
Anthony Award winners
Barry Award winners
British expatriates in Canada
Canadian male novelists
Canadian male short story writers
Canadian mystery writers
Edgar Award winners
English crime fiction writers
English male novelists
English male short story writers
English short story writers
Macavity Award winners
Members of the Detection Club
People from Armley
University of Windsor alumni
Writers from Leeds
Writers from Toronto